Lighthouse Christian Academy is a private Christian school located in Bloomington, Indiana.

Academics 
Lighthouse Christian Academy currently hosts 269 students in grades PreK-12. At school, each student participates in a distinct, Bible-based curriculum designed to achieve the goals laid forth in the school mission statement, "to develop each child's Christ-like character, intellectual ability, and physical health for the glory of God."   In early elementary, students are instructed in topics ranging from Language Arts classes to Math and Science.  Special classes in elementary school include Music, Art, and P.E.  The middle-school provides a smooth transition from elementary school into high-school, with special classes changing to electives.    The middle and high schools boast choir, band, and art (including photography) electives.  

Lighthouse Christian Academy seeks an entirely Bible-based approach to instruction.  While all students attend Bible classes throughout the entirety of their education, each class is instructed from a Christian perspective.

Controversy

National 
Lighthouse Christian Academy has recently come under fire regarding their admissions policy.

Rep. Katherine Clark, D-Massachusetts, cited Lighthouse Christian Academy's enrollment brochure, which states that the private school can refuse admission or discontinue enrollment of a student living in a home environment that includes 'homosexual or bisexual activity' or 'practicing alternate gender identity'.

Local 
The principal at Bloomington's Lighthouse Christian Academy was charged with a misdemeanor after an investigation alleging she failed to report an incident of sexual battery against a student by a fellow student during an overnight event at the school in February. The charges were later dismissed.

See also
 List of high schools in Indiana

References

External links
 Official Website

Buildings and structures in Monroe County, Indiana
Christian schools in Indiana
1991 establishments in Indiana